Renée Françoise Jeanne Richard (14 July 1928 – 31 March 2014) was a renowned French cheesemonger in Lyon and the proprietor of La Mère Richard at  Les Halles, 102 Cours Lafayette in Lyons.

See also 

 Mères of France

References

1928 births
2014 deaths
Cheese retailers
Businesspeople from Lyon
20th-century French businesswomen
20th-century French businesspeople